The International Test and Evaluation Association (ITEA) is a professional body founded in 1980.  Its primary purpose is to further the exchange of technical information in the field of test and evaluation. Membership is open to professionals, students and corporate bodies involved in the development and application of policy and techniques used to assess the effectiveness, reliability, and safety of new and existing systems and products.

External links
 ITEA Website

Professional associations based in the United States
International organizations based in the United States
International scientific organizations
Organizations based in Virginia